Labeo indramontri is fish in genus Labeo from the Chao Praya and Mekong rivers on south-east Asia.

References 

indramontri
Fish described in 1945
Cyprinid fish of Asia